Tara Station is a former rural locality in the Barcaldine Region, Queensland, Australia.

On 22 November 2019 the Queensland Government decided to amalgamate the localities in the Barcaldine Region, resulting in five expanded localities based on the larger towns: Alpha, Aramac, Barcaldine, Jericho and Muttaburra. Tara Station was incorporated into Barcaldine.

Geography 
The Central Western railway and to its immediate south the Capricorn Highway traverse the locality from east (Barcaldine) to west (Ilfracombe).

A ridge that runs from the south-west to the end through Tara Station creates a watershed. The creeks that rise to the north of the ridge are part of the Thomson River basin, while those to the south are part of the Barcoo River basin.

The principal land use is grazing on native vegetation.

History 
In March 1889 James Kenneth Cudmore established Tara pastoral station from land resumed from neighbouring pastoral properties: Barcaldine Downs, Saltern Creek and Wellshot. His first flock consisted of 40,000 sheep purchased from Isis Downs. His brother Daniel Cashel Cudmore took over the management of the property in 1913.

Education 
There are no schools in Tara Station. The nearest primary schools are in Barcaldine and Ilfracombe, while the nearest secondary school is in Barcaldine.

References 

Barcaldine Region
Unbounded localities in Queensland